Peppy Polly is a lost 1919 American silent drama film directed by Elmer Clifton and starring Dorothy Gish. D. W. Griffith produced, as he did for several of Gish's films.

Plot
As described in a film magazine, Polly Shannon (Gish) impresses Judge Monroe (Peil) with her "pep" and is recommended for employment to Mrs. Kingsley Benedict (Toncray), member of a committee investigating the Melville reform school for girls. Polly goes along, meets an old friend who is now an inmate, and learns that the conditions are deplorable and that the committee is being deceived. She and Judge Monroe plan for her to commit a theft so that she can be sentenced to Melville to aid in the investigation. Matters are complicated after she becomes an inmate and the judge dies, and she becomes the victim of the cruel matron's persecution. At the asylum she meets a young doctor whom she learns to love and the two manage to bring the truth to light. Polly is released and they are married.

Cast

Release
In New Zealand, Peppy Polly was screened as early as January, 1920, in Wellington, where it played concurrently in two different theaters. The following month, it was screened at the Octagon Theatre in Dunedin. It premiered in Whangārei at the Britannia Theatre in July, succeeding the Owen Moore-starring Rolling Stones. The film was screened in Blenheim in late 1920, ending a run at the Princess Theatre on October 12.

References

External links

Lantern slide (archived)
Archived Peppy Polly pics: #1, ..#2, .. #3

1919 films
American silent feature films
Lost American films
Films directed by Elmer Clifton
Films based on short fiction
1919 drama films
1919 lost films
Lost drama films
Silent American drama films
American black-and-white films
1910s American films